Marcus Caelius ( – ) was the senior centurion (Primus pilus) in XVIII Roman Legion who was killed in the Battle of the Teutoburg Forest. He is known from his cenotaph, which was discovered in 1620 in Birten (now a part of Xanten), Germany. Caelius is depicted wearing his military uniform, with phalerae (a type of military decoration), armillae (a type of bracelet), and a corona civica (an award for saving a fellow citizen's life), while in his right hand, he holds a vitis (carried by all centurions). On either side of his image are his freedmen, Privatus and Thiaminus.

The tombstone's lower left corner is damaged, but enough survives to determine that the text below the image once read:

English translation:

The tombstone can today be found in the Rheinisches Landesmuseum in Bonn.

References

Ancient Roman soldiers
1st-century BC Romans
1st-century Romans
AD 9 deaths
Military personnel from Bologna
Ancient Romans killed in action
40s BC births